The USS Constitution Museum is located in the Charlestown Navy Yard, which is part of the Boston National Historical Park in Boston, Massachusetts, United States. The museum is situated near the ship  at the end of Boston's Freedom Trail. The museum is housed in a restored shipyard building at the foot of Pier 2.

The museum, through its collections and interactive exhibits, tells the story of Constitution ("Old Ironsides") and the people who designed, built, and sailed her. The museum is also home to the Samuel Eliot Morison Memorial Library and includes a comprehensive archival repository of records related to the ship's history. The USS Constitution Museum is a private, non-profit organization that is managed separately from the naval ship.

Exhibits
 All Hands On Deck – An all-ages interactive exhibit that explores the realities of life at sea during the War of 1812
 Old Ironsides in War and Peace –  A in-depth look at the ship's storied history, including how and why she was built, how she earned her fame during the War of 1812, and why she is preserved at the United States Navy's oldest commissioned warship
 "Old Ironsides" War of 1812 Discovery Center – An interactive exhibit that explains the causes and consequences of the War of 1812 through games, multi-media, books, and other hands-on activities
 Constitution vs HMS Java – The story of the battle between Constitution and HMS Java, told through artwork, archival records, and artifacts associated with the battle

USS Constitution Awards Program
The Board of Directors of the Museum makes three major awards annually:

The Samuel Eliot Morison Award

The Samuel Eliot Morison Award is the highest recognition by the Board of a Trustees of the USS Constitution Museum Foundation of a person whose public service has enhanced the image of Constitution and who reflects the best of Rear Admiral Samuel Eliot Morison: artful scholarship, patriotic pride, and eclectic interest in the sea and things maritime, and a desire to preserve the best of our past for future generations.

 1977 Henry Cabot Lodge, Jr.
 1978 John W. McCormack
 1979 Leverett Saltonstall
 1980 Arleigh Burke
 1981 Joseph C. Wylie
 1982 Richard A. Rumble
 1983 John D. H. Kane
 1984 Grace Hopper
 1985 Thomas P. O'Neill, Jr.
 1986 Dodge Morgan
 1987 Edward L. Beach, Jr.
 1988 Joseph Z. Brown
 1989 Tyrone G. Martin
 1990 William M. Fowler, Jr.
 1991 W. Davis Taylor
 1992 William S. Dudley
 1993 Christopher McKee
 1994 Benjamin W. Labaree
 1995 Leon F. Kaufman
 1996 Dean C. Allard
 1997 John A. Roach
 1998 Anne Grimes Rand
 1999 Michael C. Beck
 2001 Harold D. Langley
 2002 Patrick O'Brian (posthumously)
 2004 Walter Cronkite
 2005 Nathaniel Philbrick
 2006 Ira Dye (posthumously)
 2007 David McCullough
 2008 Charles E. Brodine, Jr.; Michael J. Crawford; and Christine F. Hughes.
 2009 John B. Hattendorf
 2010 William H. White
 2011 Bernard Bailyn
 2012 David Curtis Skaggs, Jr.
 2013 Donald R. Hickey
 2014 George C. Daughan
 2015 William Martin 
 2016 W. Jeffrey Bolster
 2017 Lisa Norling
 2018 James D. Hornfischer
 2019 Ian W. Toll

The Charles Francis Adams Award
To honor museum founder Charles Francis Adams IV and his lifelong support of the community through his commitment and loyalty to those institutions and ideas which affect the quality of life of all citizens, and to recognize others who have followed his extraordinary example, the award is made annually to a person or a team of people who have given of themselves for the betterment of the community, and through whose good works profound positive change for the citizens of the community has occurred.

 1991 Jason A. Aisner (posthumously)
 1992 Caleb Loring, Jr.
 1993 John Joseph Moakley
 1994 Mrs. George L (Hessie) Sargent
 1995 J. Welles Henderson
 1997 Harvey Chet Krentzman
 1998 John J. Schiff (posthumously)
 1999 Claire V. Bloom
 2001 Edward M. Kennedy
 2002 Vivien Li
 2004 Gordon Abbott, Jr.
 2005 Gordon R. England
 2006 Thomas J. Hudner, Jr.
 2007 James (Lou) Gorman
 2008 Kevin C. Phelan
 2009 Thomas M. Menino
 2010 John P. Hamill
 2011 Robert M. Mahoney
 2012 Robert L. Reynolds
 2013 Peter H. Smyth
 2014 Thomas A. Kershaw
 2015 James T. Brett
 2016 David H. Long
 2017 Thomas A. Kennedy
 2018 Niki Tsongas
 2019 Charlie Baker

The Don Turner Award 
To honor Don Turner, former head of the USS Constitution Maintenance and Repair Facility, for his singular contribution toward the preservation of "Old Ironsides" and the skills that built her, as well as his knowledge of and dedication to the ancient art of shipbuilding, and to recognize others who are similarly dedicated to maritime preservation and advances in ship construction and design, the Don Turner Award is made annually to a person or team of people, professional or amateur, who have contributed significantly to efforts to preserve important vessels or who have made significant contributions to our knowledge and understanding of ship design and construction.

 1991 Don Turner
 1992 Maynard Bray
 1993 Harvey Steinberg
 1994 Bill Kock
 1995 Charlie Deans
 1996 Patrick Otton
 1997 Robert J. Burbank and the Riggers of USS Constitution
 1998 Howard Chatterton
 2001 Dana Hewson
 2002 Robert Neyland
 2004 Olin Stephens
 2005 Dana Wegner
 2006 Walter Rybka
 2008 Quentin Snedeker
 2009 Don Birkholz, Jr.
 2010 Richard Whelan
 2011 Elizabeth Meyer
 2012 Peter M. Stanford
 2013 Harold Burnham, Ralph W. Stanley
 2014 Nathaniel S. Wilson, Charles W. Morgan restoration team
 2015 Maine Windjammer Fleet, Captains Doug and Linda Lee; Captain John Foss
 2016 Meghan Wren Briggs
 2017 Naval History & Heritage Command Detachment Boston
 2018 National WWII Museum PT-305 Restoration Team
 2019 Schooner Ernestina-Morrissey Association

See also

National Museum of the United States Navy#Other Navy museums
List of maritime museums in the United States

References

External links

All Hands on Deck online interdisciplinary curriculum website
A Sailor's Life for Me online game website
The Family Learning Project website
Log Lines Blog from Research and Collections at the USS Constitution Museum
C-SPAN American History TV Tour of USS Constitution Museum - Part 1
C-SPAN American History TV Tour of USS Constitution Museum - Part 2

Buildings and structures completed in 1976
Charlestown, Boston
Maritime museums in Massachusetts
Military and war museums in Massachusetts
Museums established in 1972
Museums in Boston
Naval museums in the United States
Non-profit organizations based in Boston
1972 establishments in Massachusetts